Chaetostoma jegui is a species of catfish in the family Loricariidae. It is native to South America, where it occurs in the basins of the Takutu River and the Uraricoera River in the Branco River drainage in Brazil. The species reaches  SL.

References

jegui
Fish described in 1991
Catfish of South America
Fish of Brazil